Siorac-de-Ribérac (literally Siorac of Ribérac) is a commune in the Dordogne department in the Nouvelle-Aquitaine region of southwestern France.

Geography 

The commune of Siorac-de-Ribérac lies in the forest of the Double, in the west of the Dordogne department. It is bounded on its south side for about 4 km by the Rizonne stream, which separates it from the neighbouring communes of Saint-André-de-Double and Saint-Vincent-de-Connezac.

The soil is composed in part of Eocene and Oligocene sands, clays and gravels, and in part of chalk of the Campanian period.

The commune's lowest point, at 73 m, is to the south-west where the Rizonne leaves the commune for Vanxains and La Jemaye. The highest point, at 195 m, is to the north-east, at The Temple, at the boundary with Saint-Martin-de-Ribérac.

Church

The village church of St Peter in Chains began in 1154, during the English period in the region, Aquitaine. The 12th century freestone nave and bell tower survived. At that time, the church was part of the Benedictine priory of the nuns of Ligueux. In the 14th century, during the Hundred Years' War between England and France, the defensive rectangular tower was added, using quarry stone. At the same time, the walls and bell tower were increased in height, again with quarry stone. The walls at the west entrance are believed to be 3 metres thick. A bell was provided in 1851; it was replaced in 1979. The nave originally had a wooden vault; it has been replaced by a stone vault.

Population

Gallery

See also
Communes of the Dordogne département

References

Sources

 Dignac, Léopold (not dated, printed ca 1960). Monographie de Siorac-de-Ribérac. Imprimerie Périgourdine. (160 pages, octavo, illustrated with monochrome photographs)

Communes of Dordogne